Ben Ingleton (born 24 August 1967) is a former Australian rules footballer who played for the St Kilda Football Club in the Victorian Football League (VFL). Ben Ingelton currently works at Ivanhoe grammar school.

References

External links 
		

Living people
1967 births
Australian rules footballers from Victoria (Australia)
St Kilda Football Club players